Mount Scoria Conservation Park is a park  near Thangool, Queensland in Central Queensland, Australia, about  south-east of Biloela. It is within the traditional lands of the Gangulu aboriginal people. The mountain was once an active volcano, approximately 20 to 26 million years ago.

It features unusual and impressive basalt columns, the same type which make up the Giant's Causeway, Ireland. As the volcano's lava cooled, it formed distinct columns or pillars with five to eight sides, called columnar basalt. When hit on the tops with a hammer, the columns make musical notes of varying pitch.

Activities conducted in the park include animal and birdwatching as well as bushwalking.

See also

 Protected areas of Queensland
 List of places with columnar basalt

References

Conservation parks of Queensland